The Battle of Trà Bình was fought in the Trà Bình village, Trà Bồng District, on February 14–15, 1967 during the Vietnam War. The 11th Company, 3rd Battalion, 2nd Marine Brigade defeated a regimental-sized attack in four hours of close quarters combat. The People's Army of Vietnam (PAVN) and Viet Cong (VC) penetrated the company's perimeter on two occasions. The 11th Company Marines fought using every weapon available; much of the fighting was hand-to-hand. Two U.S. Marines assigned to Sub Unit One, 1st Air Naval Gunfire Liaison Company (ANGLICO), Lance Corporals Jim Porta and Dave Long, were instrumental to the company's success, killing enemy infiltrators, coordinating air support, joining a counterattack to restore the perimeter and aiding the wounded.

The battle took place after a VC defector, a former commander of a training camp, revealed that the PAVN was planning an attack on the ROKMC's 11th Company. On February 14, the PAVN 40th and 60th Battalions moved into their positions in the forest surrounding the perimeter of the ROKMC 11th Company. The regular PAVN battalions were also supported by one VC local force battalion from Quang Ngai. With their troops built up around the area, the PAVN/VC forces planned to cut all communication lines and wipe out the South Korean forces in the area.

Battle
At dawn on February 15, the battle began with the VC attempting to cut through the wires of the South Korean base. The ROKMC were dug in and waiting with requests for air-support. Due to foggy weather, the supporting AC-47s could not engage the VC, so the South Koreans only had artillery support. When the PAVN/VC had penetrated Korean positions, heavy fighting followed. Initially, the outnumbered South Koreans, though vastly superior in firepower, were pinned down, but the ranks of the PAVN/VC forces soon started to break up as the South Koreans counterattacked.

Aftermath 
When the fighting ended, South Koreans claimed that 246 PAVN/VC were killed. In addition, they reported retrieving three flamethrowers, five anti-tank rocket launchers, two machine guns, 29 rifles, 100 pieces of dynamite, and over 6,000 rounds of ammunition. ROK forces claim victory for having defended the base and preventing its capture. In the morning following the battle, the III MAF Commander visited the scene of the fighting, followed by the Commanders of I Corps, Military Assistance Command, Vietnam, the ROK Minister of National Defense and the South Korean Prime Minister. The South Korean Government awarded more decorations for the battle than any other action during the Vietnam War, including the first unit-wide promotion of enlisted Marines since the Korean War. Captain Jeong Kyung-jin and Second Lieutenant Shin Won-bae each received the Taeguk Medal, the only instance in which Korea's highest honor was awarded to two individuals.

The New York Times reported the battle as the "South Koreans' greatest victory in their 15 months in South Vietnam." Following a briefing to foreign journalists, the phrase "Myth-Making Marines" began to appear in the press, continuing the legacy of the "Ghost-Catching Marines" and "Invincible Marines" of the Korean War."

See also
Military history of South Korea during the Vietnam War

References

External links
The Blue Dragon heroes who won a brilliant victory at Tra Binh Dong operation

https://web.archive.org/web/20130208094536/http://www.vnmilitaryhistory.net/index.php?topic=3422.0

Conflicts in 1967
1967 in Vietnam
Battles of the Vietnam War involving South Korea
Battles involving Vietnam
February 1967 events in Asia
History of Quảng Ngãi province
Battles and operations of the Vietnam War in 1967